Kraków Płaszów railway station is a railway station in Płaszów, a suburb of Kraków (Lesser Poland), Poland. As of 2022, it is served by Koleje Małopolskie (KMŁ),Polregio, and PKP Intercity (EIP, InterCity, and TLK services). The station is located near Kraków-Płaszów concentration camp. The station is about 4.5 km southeast of Kraków Główny (Main) station.

Train services

The station is served by the following services:

EuroCity services (EC) (EC 95 by DB) (IC by PKP) Berlin - Frankfurt (Oder) - Rzepin - Wrocław – Katowice – Kraków – Rzeszów – Przemyśl
Express Intercity Premium services (EIP) Gdynia - Warsaw - Kraków - Rzeszów
Intercity services (IC) Zielona Góra - Wrocław - Opele - Częstochowa - Kraków - Rzeszów - Przemyśl
Intercity services (IC) Ustka - Koszalin - Poznań - Wrocław - Katowice - Kraków - Rzeszów - Przemyśl
Regional services (PR) Katowice — Kraków — Dębica 
Regional services (PR) Zakopane - Nowy Targ - Chabówka - Skawina - Kraków Płaszów 
Regional services (PR) Kraków - Bochnia - Tarnów - Dębica - Rzeszów
Regional services (PR) Kraków - Bochnia - Tarnów - Nowy Sącz - Piwniczna
Regional services (PR) Kraków - Bochnia - Tarnów - Nowy Sącz - Piwniczna - Krynica-Zdrój
Regional Service (KMŁ)   Kraków Lotnisko (Airport) - Kraków Gł. - Kopalnia - Wieliczka Rynek-Kopalnia
Regional Service (KMŁ)  Oświęcim (Auschwitz) - Trzebinia - Kraków Gł. - Tarnów

References 

Station article at koleo.pl

Railway stations in Lesser Poland Voivodeship
Railway stations served by Przewozy Regionalne InterRegio
Railway station
Railway stations in Poland opened in 1884